Maria Popistașu (born 21 January 1980 in Bucharest) is a Romanian actress.

Awards 
2005 - Gemini Award for Best Supporting Actress in a Television Film or Miniseries - Sex Traffic
 2007 - Shooting Stars Award

Selected filmography

References

External links 
 
 

Romanian film actresses
Romanian television actresses
1980 births
Living people
Actresses from Bucharest
Best Supporting Actress in a Television Film or Miniseries Canadian Screen Award winners
21st-century Romanian actresses